The 1992 Midland Bank World Indoor Bowls Championship  was held at Preston Guild Hall, Preston, England, from 21 February - 1 March 1992.

In the Singles Ian Schuback won the title beating John Price in the final. Schuback had beaten David Holt in the quarter finals in a match that lasted four hours 45 minutes. In the Pairs David Bryant and Tony Allcock secured their sixth world title and fourth consecutive title.

The Women's World Indoor Championship took place in Guernsey during April with the final being held on 5 April. The event was won by Sarah Gourlay.

Winners

Draw and results

Men's singles

Men's Pairs

Women's singles

Group stages

Knockout

External links 
Official website

References

World Indoor Bowls Championship
1992 in bowls